Carlo Bernardini (born 1966) is an Italian artist.

Life
Born in Viterbo, he received a diploma at the Fine Arts Academy in Rome in 1987. In 1997 he wrote the theoretical essay on The division of visual unity, which was published by Stampa Alternativa. In 2000 and 2005 he received a grant "Overseas Grantee" from the Pollock - Krasner Foundation of New York, and in 2002 the prize Targetti Art Light Collection “White Sculpture”.

He works with optic fiber since 1996; he has created and installed permanent public sculptures in stainless steel and optic fibers in various Italian cities, and in 1996 and 2003 he has installed site specific works at the XII and XV Quadriennial National of Rome.

He currently teaches at the Fine Arts Academy of “Brera” in Milan. He lives and works both in Rome and Milan.

External links
 Carlo Bernardini Works

1966 births
Living people
People from Viterbo
Italian artists